Oscar Owen (born 1 February 1967) is a former Caymanian cricketer.

A batsman of unknown handedness, Owen made two appearances in List A cricket for the Cayman Islands in the 2000/01 Red Stripe Bowl, playing against Bermuda and the Windward Islands. He scored a single run across both matches. Prior to these matches, he had been selected in the Cayman Islands squad for the 2000 Americas Cricket Cup, but made no appearances during the tournament.

References

External links
Oscar Owen at ESPNcricinfo
Oscar Owen at CricketArchive

1967 births
Living people
Caymanian cricketers